is the 12th single of the all-girl J-pop group Berryz Kobo, released on December 6, 2006.

The single ranked 12th in the Oricon Weekly Singles Chart.

Details 
 Main vocalist: Momoko Tsugunaga, Miyabi Natsuyaki
 Minor Vocalist: Risako Sugaya
 Center: Risako Sugaya, Yurina Kumai and Chinami Tokunaga

Track listing

CD track list 
  <br/ > (Composition and Lyrics: Tsunku, Arrangement: Yuasa Kouichi)
  <br/ > (Composition and Lyrics: Tsunku, Arrangement: Takahashi Yuichi)

Single V

References

External links 
 Profile at the Hello! Project official site

Berryz Kobo songs
2006 singles
Song recordings produced by Tsunku
Songs written by Tsunku
2006 songs
Piccolo Town singles